Glenn McLeay (born 14 August 1968) is a cyclist from New Zealand.

At the 1990 Commonwealth Games at Auckland he won a gold medal in the 4000m team pursuit, and came 9th in the 10 mile track pursuit.

At the 1992 Summer Olympics at Barcelona he came 4th in the points race and 7th in the 4000m team pursuit.

At the 1994 Commonwealth Games  he won a silver medal in the 10 mile race, came 4th in the 4000m team pursuit, and came 4th in the points race.

At the 1996 Summer Olympics at Atlanta he came 9th in the points race.

References 
 Black Gold by Ron Palenski (2008, 2004 New Zealand Sports Hall of Fame, Dunedin) p. 63

External links 

Living people
1968 births
New Zealand male cyclists
Olympic cyclists of New Zealand
Cyclists at the 1992 Summer Olympics
Cyclists at the 1996 Summer Olympics
Cyclists at the 1990 Commonwealth Games
Cyclists at the 1994 Commonwealth Games
Commonwealth Games gold medallists for New Zealand
Commonwealth Games silver medallists for New Zealand
Cyclists from Invercargill
Commonwealth Games medallists in cycling
20th-century New Zealand people
Medallists at the 1990 Commonwealth Games
Medallists at the 1994 Commonwealth Games